Vector is the critical magazine of the British Science Fiction Association (BSFA), established in 1958.

History
The first issue of Vector was published in 1958 under the  editorship of E. C. Tubb. The magazine was established as an irregular newsletter for members of the BSFA, founded in the same year, but "almost at once it began to produce reviews and essays, polemics and musings, about the nature and state of science fiction."

The magazine has changed format and periodicity many times over the years. Since 2018 it has been edited by Polina Levontin and Jo Lindsay Walton. It currently focuses on articles and interviews, and is published "two to three times per year."

References

External links
 Official website
 Back issues
 British Science Fiction Association
 Archive of scanned issues
 Index of Vector articles
 Vector index at ISFDB

1958 establishments in the United Kingdom
Science fiction magazines published in the United Kingdom
Science fiction-related magazines
Magazines established in 1958